The 1939 Richmond Spiders football team was an American football team that represented the University of Richmond as a member of the Southern Conference (SoCon) during the 1939 college football season. In their sixth season under head coach Glenn Thistlethwaite, Richmond compiled a 7–1–2 record, with a mark of 3–1–1 in conference play, finishing tied for fourth place in the SoCon.

Schedule

References

Richmond
Richmond Spiders football seasons
Richmond Spiders football